Loates is the surname of the following people:
Martin Glen Loates (b. 1945), Canadian artist
Murphy Bernard Loates (born 1945), Canadian artist, lithographer and publisher 
Sam Loates (1865–1932), British horse racing jockey 
Tommy Loates (1867–1910), British horse racing jockey, brother of Sam

English-language surnames